The effect of climate change on small island countries can be extreme because of low-lying coasts, relatively small land masses, and exposure to extreme weather. The effects of climate change, particularly sea level rise and increasingly intense tropical cyclones, threaten the existence of many island countries, island peoples and their cultures, and will alter their ecosystems and natural environments. Several Small Island Developing States (SIDS) are among the most vulnerable nations to climate change.

Some small and low population islands are without adequate resources to protect their islands, inhabitants, and natural resources. In addition to the risks to human health, livelihoods, and inhabitable space, the pressure to leave islands is often barred by the inability to access the resources needed to relocate. The nations of the Caribbean, Pacific Islands and Maldives are already experiencing considerable impacts of climate change, making efforts to implement climate change adaptation a critical issue for them.

Efforts to combat these environmental changes are ongoing and multinational. Due to their vulnerability and limited contribution to greenhouse gas emissions, some island countries have made advocacy for global cooperation on climate change mitigation a key aspect of their foreign policy. Governments face a complex task when combining gray infrastructure with green infrastructure and nature-based solutions to help with disaster risk management in areas such as flood control, early warning systems, nature-based solutions, and integrated water resource management. As of March 2022, the Asian Development Bank has committed $3.62 billion to help small island developing states with climate change, transport, energy, and health projects.

Greenhouse gas emissions 
Small Island Developing States make minimal contribution to global greenhouse gas emissions, with a combined total of less than 1%.
However, that does not indicate that greenhouse emissions are not produced at all, and it is recorded that the annual total greenhouse gas emissions from islands could range from 292.1 to 29,096.2 [metric] tonne -equivalent.

Impacts on the natural environment 
Expected impacts on small islands include:
extreme weather events
changes in sea level 
increased sensitivity and exposure to the effects of climate change.
deterioration in coastal conditions, such as beach erosion and coral bleaching, which will likely affect local resources such as fisheries, as well as the value of tourism destinations.
increased inundation, storm surge, erosion, and other coastal hazards caused by sea-level rise, threatening vital infrastructure, settlements, and facilities that support the livelihood of island communities.
reduction of already limited water resources to the point that they become insufficient to meet demand during low-rainfall periods by mid-century, especially on small islands (such as in the Caribbean and the Pacific Ocean)
invasion by non-native species increasing with higher temperatures, particularly in mid- and high-latitude islands.
There are many secondary effects of climate change and sea-level rise particular to island nations. According to the US Fish and Wildlife Service, climate change in the Pacific Islands will cause "continued increases in air and ocean surface temperatures in the Pacific, increased frequency of extreme weather events, and increased rainfall during the summer months and a decrease in rainfall during the winter months". This would entail distinct changes to the small, diverse, and isolated island ecosystems and biospheres present within many of these island nations.

Sea level rise 
One of the dominant manifestations of climate change is sea level rise. NOAA estimates that "since 1992, new methods of satellite altimetry (the measurement of elevation or altitude) indicate a rate of rise of 0.12 inches per year".  Similarly NASA calculates that the average sea level rise is 3.41 mm per year and that sea-level rise is directly caused by the expansion of water as it warms and the melting of polar ice caps. Both of these changes are dependent on global warming as a result of climate change. Sea level rise is especially threatening to low-lying island nations because seas are encroaching upon limited habitable land and threatening existing cultures. Stefan Rahmstorf, a professor of Ocean Physics at Potsdam University in Germany notes "even limiting warming to 2 degrees, in my view, will still commit some island nations and coastal cities to drown."

Research published in 2015 contradicts the claim that rising sea levels will necessarily submerge island nations. Studies by Paul Kench, a geomorphologist at the University of Auckland, have shown that "reef islands change shape and move around in response to shifting sediments, and that many of them are growing in size, not shrinking, as sea level inches upward". At the same time Kench says that "for the areas that have been transformed by human development, such as the capitals of Kiribati, Tuvalu, and the Maldives, the future is considerably gloomier" because these islands cannot adapt to rising sea levels and are therefore greatly threatened.

Impacts on people

The Intergovernmental Panel on Climate Change warned in 2001 that small island countries will experience considerable economic and social consequences due to climate change.

Agriculture and fisheries 
Climate change poses a risk to food security in many Pacific Islands, impacting fisheries and agriculture. As sea level rises, island nations are at increased risk of losing coastal arable land to degradation as well as salination. Once the limited available soil on these islands becomes salinated, it becomes very difficult to produce subsistence crops such as breadfruit. This would severely impact the agricultural and commercial sector in nations such as the Marshall Islands and Kiribati.

In addition, local fisheries would also be affected by higher ocean temperatures and increased ocean acidification. As ocean temperatures rise and the pH of oceans decreases, many fish and other marine species would die out or change their habits and range. As well as this, water supplies and local ecosystems such as mangroves, are threatened by global warming.

Economic impacts 
SIDS may also have reduced financial and human capital to mitigate climate change risk, as many rely on international aid to cope with disasters like severe storms. Worldwide, climate change is projected to have an average annual loss of 0.5% GDP by 2030; in Pacific SIDS, it will be 0.75–6.5% GDP by 2030. Caribbean SIDS will have average annual losses of 5% by 2025, escalating to 20% by 2100 in projections without regional mitigation strategies. The tourism sector of many island countries is particularly threatened by increased occurrences of extreme weather events such as hurricanes and droughts.

Public health 
Climate change impacts small island ecosystems in ways that have a detrimental effect on public health. In island nations, changes in sea levels, temperature, and humidity may increase the prevalence of mosquitoes and diseases carried by them such as malaria and Zika virus. Rising sea levels and severe weather such as flooding and droughts may render agricultural land unusable and contaminate freshwater drinking supplies. Flooding and rising sea levels also directly threaten populations, and in some cases may be a threat to the entire existence of the island.

Mitigation and adaptation

Relocation and migration 

Climate migration has been discussed in popular media as a potential adaptation approach for the populations of islands threatened by sea level rise. A 2015 review in Climatic Change found that these depictions are often sensationalist or problematic, although migration may likely form a part of adaptation. Mobility has long been a part of life in islands, but could be used in combination with local adaptation measures.

Climate resilient economies 
Many SIDS now understand the need to move towards low-carbon, climate resilient economies, as set out in the Caribbean Community (CARICOM) implementation plan for climate change-resilient development. SIDS often rely heavily on imported fossil fuels, spending an ever-larger proportion of their GDP on energy imports. Renewable technologies have the advantage of providing energy at a lower cost than fossil fuels and making SIDS more sustainable. Barbados has been successful in adopting the use of solar water heaters (SWHs). A 2012 report published by the Climate & Development Knowledge Network showed that its SWH industry now boasts over 50,000 installations. These have saved consumers as much as US$137 million since the early 1970s. The report suggested that Barbados' experience could be easily replicated in other SIDS with high fossil fuel imports and abundant sunshine.

International cooperation 

The governments of several island nations have made political advocacy for greater international ambition on climate change mitigation and climate change adaptation a component of their foreign policy and international alliances. The Alliance of Small Island States (ASIS) have had some sway in the United Nations Framework Convention on Climate Change. The 43 members of the alliance have held the position of limiting global warming to 1.5°C, and advocated for this at the 2015 United Nations Climate Change Conference, influencing the goals of the Paris Agreement. Marshall Islands Prime Minister Tony deBrum was central in forming the High Ambition Coalition at the conference. Meetings of the Pacific Islands Forum have also discussed the issue.

The Maldives and Tuvalu particularly have played a prominent role on the international stage. In 2002, Tuvalu threatened to sue the United States and Australia in the International Court of Justice for their contribution to climate change and for not ratifying the Kyoto Protocol. The governments of both of these countries have cooperated with environmental advocacy networks, non-governmental organisations and the media to draw attention to the threat of climate change to their countries. At the 2009 United Nations Climate Change Conference, Tuvalu delegate Ian Fry spearheaded an effort to halt negotiations and demand a comprehensive, legally binding agreement.

By country and region

Caribbean

East Timor 
East Timor's agriculture and food security is threatened by climate change. Sea level rise also threatens its coastal areas, including capital city Dili.

Maldives

Pacific islands

Fiji

Kiribati 

The existence of the nation of Kiribati is imperilled by rising sea levels, with the country losing land every year. Many of its islands are currently or becoming inhabitable due to their shrinking size. Thus, the majority of the country's population resides in only a handful of islands, with more than half of its residents living on one island alone, Tarawa. This leads to other issues such as severe overcrowding in such a small area. In 1999, the uninhabited islands of Tebua Tarawa and Abanuea both disappeared underwater. The government's Kiribati Adaptation Program was launched in 2003 to mitigate the country's vulnerability to the issue. In 2008, fresh water supplies began being encroached by seawater, prompting President Anote Tong to request international assistance to begin relocating the country's population elsewhere.

Marshall Islands

Palau

Solomon Islands 

Between 1947 and 2014, six islands of the Solomon Islands disappeared due to sea level rise, while another six shrunk by between 20 and 62 per cent. Nuatambu Island was the most populated of these with 25 families living on it; 11 houses washed into the sea by 2011.

Tuvalu

Tuvalu is a small Polynesian island nation located in the Pacific Ocean. It can be found about halfway between Hawaii and Australia. It is made up of nine tiny islands, five of which are coral atolls while the other four consists of land rising from the sea bed. All are low-lying islands with no point on Tuvalu being higher than 4.5m above sea level. Beside Funafuti, the capital of Tuvalu, sea-level rise is estimated at 1.2 ± 0.8 mm/year. As well as this, the dangerous peak high tides in Tuvalu are becoming higher causing greater danger. In response to sea level rise, Tuvalu is considering resettlement plans in addition to pushing for increased action in confronting climate change at the UN.

São Tomé and Príncipe

Seychelles 
In the Seychelles, the impacts of climate change were observable in precipitation, air temperature and sea surface temperature by the early 2000s. Climate change poses a threat to its coral reef ecosystems, with drought conditions in 1999 and a mass bleaching event in 1998. Water management will be critically impacted.

Singapore

See also
Alliance of Small Island States
Climate change in the Caribbean
Small Island Developing States
Islands First
Majuro Declaration
Ambo Declaration
Tarawa Climate Change Conference

References

Further reading

External links 

 Small Islands - IPCC

Climate change and the environment
+
Small Island Developing States
Climate change by country and region
Regional effects of climate change